Bunaftine (or bunaphtine) is an antiarrhythmic agent. It is classified in class III.

References

Antiarrhythmic agents
Potassium channel blockers
1-Naphthyl compounds
Carboxamides
Diethylamino compounds